Nduese Essien  (born 2 February 1944) was a Nigerian National Assembly representative from Akwa Ibom state from 1999 to 2007, the position he held at the House of Representatives includes the leader of south-south parliamentary caucus and chairman of House committee on anti corruption, National Ethics and value under the late president Umaru Yar’Adua, and he later appointed him into the technical committee in the Niger Delta. He was also appointed Federal Minister of Lands, Housing & Urban Development on 6 April 2010, when acting president Goodluck Jonathan announced his new cabinet.

Early career

Essien was born on 2 February 1944 in Nta Isip-Ikot Ibiok, Eket Local Government Area of Akwa Ibom State.
He attended Ahmadu Bello University, Zaria, where he obtained a B.Sc. in business administration in 1972. 
Essien's first job was with The Chronicle newspaper in the commercial department. In 1974 he became a lecturer at the College of Technology, Calabar.
He left to start a business consultancy practice in 1979, and later ran a successful company marketing books for students.

Political career

In 1979 Essien was the Public Relations Officer of the National Party of Nigeria in Eket. 
He remained active in local politics, and in 1999 was selected as People's Democratic Party (PDP) National Assembly candidate for the Eket, Onna, Esit Eket and Ibeno constituency in Nigeria. He was elected, and in April 2003 was reelected, leaving office in May 2007.

During his first term, Essien chaired the South South Parliamentary Caucus, and was a member of committees on internal affairs and women's affairs. In 2003, he was appointed chairman of the House Committee on Anti-Corruption, National Ethics and Values.
He was also appointed chairman of the Nigerian Chapter of the African Parliamentarians Network against Corruption, and was later elected regional director in charge of West Africa.
After leaving office in 2007, he was a member of the National Technical Assessment Committee on the Niger Delta region.

Following his 6 April 2010 appointment as Minister of Lands, Housing and Urban Development, Essien said land reform and provision of housing were key items in the administration's seven-point agenda.
On 13 April 2010 he pledged to revamp decaying housing estates and to deliver 54,500 new houses within the next 10 months.

References

1944 births
Living people
Federal ministers of Nigeria
Peoples Democratic Party members of the House of Representatives (Nigeria)
National Party of Nigeria politicians
Members of the House of Representatives (Nigeria)